Huangshan North railway station is a railway station of Hefei–Fuzhou High-Speed Railway in Xintan, Tunxi District, Huangshan, Anhui and belongs to the China Railway Shanghai Group. It commenced services with the Hefei-Fuzhou HSR on June 28, 2015.

The station lies on the Hefei-Fuzhou HSR, part of the Beijing–Taipei high-speed rail corridor, and is the terminus of the Hangzhou–Huangshan intercity railway. The station is the second largest high-speed railway station in Anhui Province.

Rail services

The station is currently served by services operated by the following China Railway groups：

References

Railway stations in China opened in 2015
Railway stations in Anhui